The Staves are an English indie folk trio of sisters Emily, Jessica and Camilla Staveley-Taylor from Watford, Hertfordshire, England.

Career 
The Staves began performing together at open-mic nights in Watford hosted by a local pub, The Horns. Originally performing as The Staveley-Taylors, the trio later changed their name to The Staves.

The group appeared on the Tom Jones album Praise and Blame, released in July 2010. They supported Mt. Desolation on their UK tour in autumn 2010. Jessica Staveley-Taylor also performed as part of Mt. Desolation and provided vocals for their eponymous album. The Staves released the Live at Cecil Sharp House EP and the Mexico EP in 2011, and appeared on Fionn Regan's third studio album, 100 Acres of Sycamore.

The Staves toured in the United States while supporting The Civil Wars in January 2012. They followed these appearances with performances at South by Southwest and a tour in March and April with Bear's Den, Nathaniel Rateliff and Ben Howard. This tour was the subject of the film, "Austin to Boston", a documentary by Marcus Haney. The band supported Bon Iver on their May and June 2012 US and Canadian tour.

The band's debut album, Dead & Born & Grown, was released in November 2012 and produced by Glyn Johns and Ethan Johns.

An excerpt from their performance of "Facing West" on Later... with Jools Holland was featured on the This is BBC Two promotional programme.

The second full-length album, If I Was, was released 23 March 2015 on Atlantic Records in the UK/EU and on 31 March on Nonesuch Records in the US; the record was produced by Justin Vernon of Bon Iver. The album debuted at #14 on the Official UK Album Chart. In July 2015, The Staves performed with Bon Iver as guest artists along with Colin Stetson, yMusic, and No BS! Brass for Bon Iver's return to the stage as part of the Eaux Claires Festival in Eau Claire, Wisconsin. They have also performed as the warm-up act for Florence and the Machine on Florence's How Big Tour supporting How Big, How Blue, How Beautiful.

The Staves joined the live line-up of Bon Iver for the latter's Asia tour in late February and early March 2016.

On 24 November 2017, The Staves released The Way is Read − a full-length album created in conjunction with NYC-based chamber music ensemble yMusic. This album is available on vinyl, via the streaming service TIDAL in both normal and high quality MQA (Master Quality Authenticated) formats, and as an MP3 download. There is no CD version available yet.

In October/November 2018 they supported First Aid Kit on their Rebel Heart tour.

In January 2020, The Staves announced that Emily Staveley-Taylor would not take part in touring, following the birth of her daughter.

In March 2020, The Staves announced they would be performing at the Glastonbury festival in 2020. But due to concerns over the 2019–20 coronavirus pandemic, the festival had to be cancelled.

On 5 February 2021, their third studio album Good Woman was released via Atlantic Records UK and Nonesuch Records. The album was produced by John Congleton and charted at number 13 in the UK albums chart.

Personal lives 
The sisters learned to play guitar from their father while growing up in Watford. As children, they aspired to create a sketch comedy television programme together. They enjoy Guinness and are vocal in challenging tropes about sensitive wilderness-bound artists that dominate modern folk music culture.

In addition to touring with Bon Iver and producing If I Was with Justin Vernon, the sisters have become friends with the Wisconsin-born musician.

In summer 2018, the sisters' mother, Jean, a former teacher who had encouraged them to follow their dream of making music, died.

In 2019, Emily became a mother to a daughter called Margo.

Discography

Studio albums

Live albums

Extended plays

Singles

References

External links 
 Official website
 The Staves talk to Michael Hann
 The Staves Live In Session at The BBC
 2011 interview with The Staves

British folk rock groups
English country music groups
Sibling musical trios
People from Watford
Musicians from Hertfordshire
Musical groups established in 2009